Sid Sutton is a British graphic designer most famous for designing the Doctor Who title sequences from 1980 until 1986.
The title sequences for Doctor Who were the starfield versions and were used from The Leisure Hive until the end of The Trial of a Time Lord. For 1987's Time and the Rani, Oliver Elmes designed the titles.  
Sid Sutton also provided the cover designs for the earliest BBC VHS Video Doctor Who releases, including The Seeds of Death and Day of the Daleks. He also created logos for Sveriges Television.

Immediately prior to his work on Doctor Who, he had been nominated for a BAFTA for his graphics on the Robert Banks Stewart-created Shoestring that was a precursor to Bergerac, another show for which he provided the titles.

References

External links

British graphic designers
Living people
Year of birth missing (living people)